Kaiep is one of three Kairiru languages of Turubu Rural LLG, East Sepik Province, Papua New Guinea. It is spoken in the Kep, Taul, and Samap village area in Turubu Rural LLG.

References

Languages of Papua New Guinea
Schouten languages
Vulnerable languages